A quest is a journey toward a goal.

Quest may also refer to:

Computing
 Quest Development, a software company
 Quest Oracle Community, not-for-profit organization
 QuEST, research program
 Quest Software, a management software company
 Quantum Experiments using Satellite Technology, India's Quantum communication satellite.

Entertainment

Film and television
 Quest (1996 film), an animated short
 Quest (2006 film), an Indian drama film
 Quest (2017 film), an American documentary film
 Quest (TV channel), a UK TV channel
 Quest (American TV network), a US over-the-air television network
 Quest (Canadian TV series), a 1960s television anthology
 Jonny Quest, a fictional character
 Richard Quest (born 1962), English television journalist

Gaming
 Quest (gamebook)
 Quest (video gaming), a task in a video game
 Quest 64, a 1998 Nintendo 64 game
 Quest Corporation, a video game company
Oculus Quest, a virtual reality headset by Oculus
Meta Quest 2, a successor to the Oculus Quest

Music
 Quest (band), an American jazz band
 Quest (singer) (born 1982), Filipino hip-hop and R&B singer and songwriter
 Quest, an American jazz group led by Don Randi
 Quest, a 2016 mini-album by Japanese band White Ash
 Quest Crew, a dance crew

Organizations
 Quest Aircraft, an aircraft manufacturer
 Quest Community Newspapers, a newspaper company in Queensland, Australia
 Quest Diagnostics, a clinical laboratory services company
 Quest International, a flavor and fragrances company
 Quaid-e-Awam University of Engineering, Science & Technology, Pakistan
 Quest University, Canada

Periodicals
 Quest (British magazine), a fortnightly science/technology magazine for youth
 Quest (Dutch magazine), monthly science/technology magazine in the Netherlands
 Quest (Indian magazine)
 Quest (lifestyle magazine)
 Quest (Theosophical magazine), a publication of the Theosophical Society in America
 QUEST: An African Journal of Philosophy
 Quest: The History of Spaceflight, a quarterly journal
 Quest, a publication of the Ambassador International Cultural Foundation

Science
 Q and U Extragalactic Submillimeter Telescope, part of cosmic microwave background polarization experiment
 QUEST (Cluster of Excellence), a collaborative research project in Germany
 Quasar Equatorial Survey Team, an astronomical survey in Venezuela
 Quaternion estimator algorithm, a solution to Wahba's problem
 Quest Joint Airlock, part of the International Space Station
 QUEST Q-shu University Experiment with Steady-State Spherical Tokamak, a fusion research experimental device  on the campus of Kyushu University in Fukuoka, Japan

Other
 Quest (cigarette), a cigarette brand by Vector Tobacco
 "Quest" (Anderson novelette), a novelette by Poul Anderson
 Quest (ship), a 1917 sealing ship and polar exploration vessel
 Quest, a model of velomobile
 Nissan Quest, a minivan

See also
 LaSilla–Quest Variability Survey, an astronomical survey in Chile
 Quest for the historical Jesus
 The Quest (disambiguation)
 Questing (disambiguation)
 Qwest (disambiguation)
 A Tribe Called Quest, an American hip-hop band
 World of Quest, an animated Canadian TV series